Robin Bartlett (born April 22, 1951) is an American actress. She is best known for her roles in two NBC sitcoms The Powers That Be and Mad About You.

Career
She appeared in the short-lived series The Powers That Be. She played the lesbian sister of a filmmaker for Mad About You and a television producer in Series. She played a teacher in each films, Lean on Me and If Looks Could Kill. She played the drug rehab roommate for Postcards from the Edge. In addition, she played the dean of a private school in an episode ("The Ida Funkhouser Roadside Memorial") of the HBO series Curb Your Enthusiasm.

In June 2010, it was announced Barlett would play Hannah Pitt in Signature Theatre Company's 20th-anniversary production of Tony Kushner's Angels in America. She played Bridget Kearns in Shutter Island in 2010.

In 2013, she portrayed Miranda Crump in American Horror Storys second season, Asylum, and later that year returned for the third season, Coven, portraying Cecily Pembroke.

She starred in the 2014 film H., for which she was nominated for the Independent Spirit Award for Best Supporting Female in 2016.

Filmography

Film

Television

References

External links

American film actresses
American television actresses
Actresses from New York City
Living people
20th-century American actresses
21st-century American actresses
1951 births